El Emir Abdelkader is a municipality in northwestern Algeria.

References 

Communes of Aïn Témouchent Province